Sorek may refer to:

Adi Sorek (born 1970), Israeli writer
Nahal Sorek
Sorek, Nepal